Wallace Potts (4 February 1947 – 29 June 2006) was an American film director, screenwriter, and archivist. He is best known for his work as the research archivist for the Rudolf Nureyev Foundation in Bath, England, from 1993 until his death in 2006.

Early life and education
Wallace Bean Potts was born in Birmingham, Alabama, soon after the end of World War II, into a family of English descent. As the South recovered from the war effort, he was raised in middle-class comfort by his parents, Wallace and Ruth Potts of Montgomery, and was educated in local primary schools and at Shades Valley High School. He went on to attend Georgia Institute of Technology in Atlanta, where he was graduated summa cum laude with a bachelor's degree in physics. While in college he became interested in film making, which led him to attend film school at the University of California at Los Angeles.

Life with Nureyev
Potts met Rudolf Nureyev in June 1969 in Atlanta, during a Royal Ballet tour of North America. The two men were immediately attracted to each other. Potts was 21 years old, tall, athletic, and with a winning personality. Exuding a gentle Southern charm, he was also exceptionally handsome. Nureyev was ten years older, an international star of the ballet renowned for his technical prowess, smoldering Tatar looks, and strong personality. After their first encounter, they were to live together, off and on, for the next seven years, sometimes at Nureyev's house in London, sometimes on tour.

As a would-be film maker, Potts was happy not only to accompany Nureyev on his  travels but to practice his new skills by making film records of Nureyev's working life on the road. He was well-liked by everyone associated with Nureyev because of his gentle nature, sweetness of demeanor, and remarkable candor. He brought stability and companionship into Nureyev's life and, because he never attempted to compete with his lover, he was a calming influence on the tempestuous star.

Professional career
Potts began his professional career in film-making as first assistant director of the 1972 Australian film version of the ballet Don Quixote, directed by Nureyev and Robert Helpmann, both of whom appeared in the film: Nureyev as the dashing barber Basilio and Helpmann in the critical title role. The ballerina in the role of Kitri was the effervescent Lucette Aldous. This was an exceptionally successful endeavor, bringing the excitement of live performance to a video screen. Many years later, Potts was the driving force behind restoration of the film by the Australian Broadcasting Corporation in 2000 for use in several international tributes to Nureyev.

During his years with Nureyev, Potts had opportunities to work in various capacities for such well-known film directors as Pier Paolo Pasolini, Mike Nichols, and James Bridges. On his own, he worked as writer and director of the films Demi-Gods (1974), More, More, More (1976), Le Beau Mec (a.k.a. Dude, 1979), a gay erotic film shot in Paris, Tales of the Unliving and the Undead (1988), and Psycho Cop (1989).

Final years
In his last years, Potts was responsible for assembling, on behalf of the Rudolf Nureyev Foundation and the Fondation Rudolf Noureev, all film footage of the dance star. In putting the collection together Potts built upon the library Nureyev had himself compiled. He added all the many 16mm films he had made of Nureyev rehearsing and performing, and he brought together every other known film and video from sources around the world. The result is an exhaustive record of Nureyev as dancer and man, now available in both the New York Public Library for the Performing Arts and in the Centre Nationale de la Danse in Paris.

Wallace Potts died of complications of lymphoma in 2006 in a hospital in Los Angeles, California, He was only 59 years old, He was mourned by many as a remarkable friend.

References

External links

The Rudolf Nureyev Foundation

1947 births
2006 deaths
Writers from Birmingham, Alabama
American LGBT writers
LGBT film directors
American film directors
American archivists
Deaths from lymphoma
Georgia Tech alumni
Deaths from cancer in California
20th-century LGBT people